Rodrigo Muñoz is an Uruguayan footballer (soccer player). 

Rodrigo Muñoz may also refer to:
 Rodrigo Muñoz (Asturian count), died in or shortly after 1116, a count in León
 Rodrigo Muñoz de Guzmán, died ca. 1186, founder of the Castilian House of Guzmán
 Rodrigo Muñoz (Galician count), a count in León, killed in the Battle of Sagrajas in 1086